Peter Graves (1926–2010) was an American actor.

Peter Graves may also refer to:
 Peter Graves, 8th Baron Graves (1911–1994), English actor and peer
 Peter Graves (announcer) (born 1952), American TV sportscaster and skiing coach
 Peter Graves (cricketer) (born 1946), English cricketer
 Peter Graves (motorcyclist) (born 1966), British motorcycle road racer
 Peter Graves (rower) (born 1984), American Olympic rower
 Peter D. Graves, American film producer, marketing executive and consultant
 Pete Graves (born 1982), British sports reporter
 Peter Graves (musician), American horn player and bandleader of the Peter Graves Orchestra, see The Birthday Concert album
 Peter Graves (novel), a fictional work by William Pène du Bois